The Grand Accélérateur National d’Ions Lourds (GANIL), or Large Heavy Ion National Accelerator, is a French national nuclear physics research center in Caen. The facility has been in operation since 1983, and consists primarily of two serialised synchrocyclotrons.

See also 
Projects:
 Fazia

Similar facilities:
 GSI
 Riken, Japan
 NSCL, USA
 Dubna, Russia
 CERN
 TRIUMF

External links 
 GANIL
 Scholarpedia article

Laboratories in France
Nuclear research institutes
Research institutes in France
French National Centre for Scientific Research
Institutes associated with CERN